iFanboy is a weekly audio podcast which focuses on comic books, comic book publishing, and comic book creators. It stars Josh Flanagan, Ron Richards, and Conor Kilpatrick.
The first episode of the audio podcast was released on November 2, 2005, and the first episode of the video podcast on January 17, 2007. They were bought by the Boulder-based Graphic.ly in 2010 to add the ready-built community of iFanboy to their digital comics platform. In early 2013, iFanboy amicably split from Graphic.ly and once again became an independently run website by the iFanboys. Shortly thereafter, Ron Richards - a founder of the site and podcast - stepped down as one of the hosts of the show for a position at Image Comics. On September 1, 2013, Flanagan and Kilpatrick issued a joint statement announcing a scale back of day-to-day operations on the iFanboy website. New content - such as reviews, feature articles, previews and the new comic pull list - would no longer be created. Despite scaling back written content, they plan to continue the weekly podcast and infrequent Book- and Talksplodes, with Paul Montgomery. In 2014, Montgomery left iFanboy for the website Panels. In 2015, Ron Richards who had left Image comics returned to iFanboy. The original iFanboys continue on the podcast.

Audio podcast

The Audio Podcast, also known as the iFanboy.com Pick of the Week Podcast, is where the iFanboys tell you the best books that they have read that week and answer listener e-mail and voicemail. It usually begins with an iFanboy informing you that you are listening to the iFanboy.com Pick of the Week podcast and then the episode number. This is followed by a music selection and a brief introduction of what iFanboy is. Each week one of the iFanboys picks a comic book and then they talk about that book and other books that came out that week. After the "Pick of the Week" section, they answer e-mail and voicemail and wrap up the show. Exceptions to this format are Special Edition Episodes, which include Creator Interview, Movie Review, or Year End Wrap-Ups. On September 4, 2008, iFanboy officially released the first episode of Talksplode, an audio podcast devoted to interviews with comic creators. As of December 2014, 464 regular episodes have been produced. In a post on their website, it was announced that founding member Ron Richards will be resigning from his editorial and podcasting host roles with the website. The reason for Richards' departure was cited to be his acceptance of a job with Image Comics. Richards final podcast was the Pick of the Week Podcast Episode #370 on January 27, 2013. Starting with episode #371, long time contributor to the website, Paul Montgomery, replaced Richards as the third iFanboy.

Episode #401 on September 1, 2013 was the last episode to use the iFanboy review/user review/audience question format. After announcing the scale back of day-to-day operations on the iFanboy website, it was also announced that logical changes to the podcast format would be taking place.

On occasion, iFanboy also puts out special edition podcasts, regarding movies or other forms of media that somehow relate to comics. They also traditionally do an end of the year "media roundup," where the hosts go over some their top picks in various spheres of media

In early 2015, Paul Montgomery stepped down from the podcast as a regular host, though he makes guest appearances from time to time. In 2014, Montgomery launched Panels.net, a comics commentary website, with the help of Book Riot. Many in the starting lineup were iFanboy writing alumni and some popular iFanbase users.

Episode #491 on June 28, 2015 saw the return of co-founder Ron Richards as a regular host.

Video podcast
The iFanboy Video Podcast is totally different from the audio podcast. It is produced by Revision3 and stars the same three iFanboys, but also occasionally features Gordon "the Intern". In the video show, the iFanboys discuss comics related to that episode's theme. They also read viewer e-mail, have creator interviews, go to Comic Conventions, respond to voicemail, talk about specific creators or lines of books or series, etc. The show is most commonly filmed in a casual, "on the couch" setting. The show starts with a cold open before the opening titles play, accompanied by 'Never In' by 'The 101'. In the video podcasts there are adverts from iFanboy and Revision3's different sponsors, most notably Go Daddy. At the end of the show there is usually an outtake from the show and the credits differ in speed depending on how long the outtake is, this is also accompanied by 'Never In' by 'The 101'. On October 3, 2010, it was announced that iFanboy would no longer be a part of the Revision3 network. After leaving Revision3, iFanboy continued to produce a video podcast hosted on their own website. The weekly format of the show was discontinued on November 30, 2011. Video shows are still produced to showcase creator interviews that iFanboy conducts at various conventions that they attend throughout the year. As of December 23, 2012, 277 video shows have been produced.

iFanboy Mini
iFanboy Mini was a short-form video podcast released Monday through Wednesday and then on Friday and Saturday , in the style of Tekzilla Daily and Lil' Internet Superstar, in which the iFanboys answered questions, made recommendations, highlighted the shipping lists, talked about the Pick of the Week, or anything else they could think of. It was only a few minutes long, like the other daily Revision3 shows. iFanboy announced on September 29, 2008 that the iFanboy Mini would be discontinued as of October 4, 2008 with the 145th episode stating that the Mini was experimental in nature and proved to be too time-consuming to produce.

Contributors
A list of the writers who worked for the iFanboy website in various capacities before the September 2013 scale back.

 David Accampo
 Matt Adler
 Bon Alimagno
 Chris Arrant
 David Brothers
 Josh Christie
 Ali Colluccio
 Paul Dini
 Daniel Robert Epstein
 Sonia Harris
 Austin Hartman
 Ryan Haupt
 Jonathan Hickman
 Tom Katers
 Molly McIsaac
 Paul Montgomery (Later promoted to host)
 Jim Mroczkowski
 Chris Neseman
 Jeff Reid
 Josh Richardson
 Mike Romo
 Gabe Roth
 Gordon "the Intern" Strain
 Dave Weise
 Jason Wood
 Timmy Wood

iFanbase
Fans of the podcast have taken to calling themselves the iFanbase on social media. The name appears as early as 2006 on the Revision 3 forums. The name arose out of the active comments section beneath each of the articles published on the site until the September 2013 scale back. The iFanboys has long prided themselves for having an active yet cordial comments section. Several of these community members had their own reviews read as part of the podcast.

The iFanbase name has been most often used by a grouping of New York metropolitan area-based fans of the podcast and website who would host "Tweetups" and attend the New York City Live Shows of iFanboy.

Notes

References

External links
 
 iFanboy Discussion Forums
 Revision3

 

2005 podcast debuts
Video podcasts
Audio podcasts
Comic book podcasts
Revision3